Coleophora longipalpella is a moth of the family Coleophoridae. It is found in Turkey.

References

longipalpella
Endemic fauna of Turkey
Moths described in 1903
Moths of Asia